The Barber–Mizell feud was a feud in Brevard and Orange counties, Florida in 1870 resulting in 41 deaths and no criminal convictions that arose when cattle baron Mose Barber disputed the jurisdiction of Orange County Sheriff and tax collector David Mizell over his land. When Mizell rode to collect taxes from Barber, he was waylaid and killed. In the resultant feud, 41 men were killed.

Feud
Barber, a staunch Confederate supporter, did not want to pay taxes to the government and felt that Mizell—himself a Confederate veteran—was a carpetbagging traitor out to exploit his former comrades. As a result of the man's non-compliance, Mizell repeatedly took Barber's cattle as payment for taxes. Then on February 21, 1870, Barber—fed up at this point and having warned Mizell not to set foot on his land again—fatally shot the sheriff as he ventured into his property to take more cattle. Although the dying sheriff asked his family not to avenge his death, they nevertheless went on a revenge spree which was reciprocated by the Barbers and their supporters. Eight died, and no one was convicted for the murders. But the feud finally ended during the 1940s when a Barber married a Mizell.

Feud-related deaths 
These feud-related deaths were enumerated in the 1870 Mortality schedule of Orange County, Florida:
Isaac Barber, 35, white male, married, born in Georgia, shot in March.
Moses Barber, 37, white male, married, born in Georgia, Farmer, drowned in March.
William Bronson, 37, white male, married, farmer, born in South Carolina, shot in March.
David Mizell, Orange County Sheriff, 36, white male, married, born 12 Nov 1833 Columbia County Florida, shot from ambush 21 Feb 1870.
Needham Yates, 52, white male, married, born in Georgia, Farmer, shot in March.
William Yates, 32, white male, married, born in Georgia, Farmer, shot in March.
Needham Yates, Jr.

Further reading 
"Cattle Feud Slaughtered Mizells, Barbers during Reconstruction," by Mark Andrews, The Orlando Sentinel, Sunday, March 29, 1992, Page K-6.
Orlando: A Centennial History, by Eve Bacon, The Mickler House Publishers, Chuluota, Florida, 1975.
Pine Castle: A Walk Down Memory Lane, by Ruth Barber Linton, Book Crafters, Chelsea, Michigan, 1993.
Pioneers of Wiregrass Georgia, by Huxford Folks (A series of genealogical compilations covering the counties of Irwin, Appling, Wayne, Camden, and Glynn).
Orlando in the Long, long, ago.. . and now, by Kena Fries, Florida Press, Orlando, 1938.
Florida's Frontier: The Way Hit Wuz, by Mary Ida Bass Shearhart, Magnolia Press, Gainesville, Georgia, 1992. Write her at: 2850 Boggy Creek Road, Kissimmee, FL 34744.

External links 
Service marks end to bloody feud that began with sheriff's death
Florida Frontiers: Cattle sparked Barber-Mizell feud
The Great Florida Range Wars The Legendary Old West Had Died By The Late 1800s, But For Cowboys In The Wild, Wild East, Cattle Rustling And Gunfights Were Still A Way Of Life

References 

1870 in Florida
Conflicts in 1870
Feuds in the United States
History of Brevard County, Florida
Riots and civil disorder during the Reconstruction Era
Riots and civil disorder in Florida